Benjamin Oliver Davis Jr. (December 18, 1912 – July 4, 2002) was a United States Air Force (USAF) general and commander of the World War II Tuskegee Airmen.

He was the first African-American brigadier general in the USAF. On December 9, 1998, he was advanced to four-star general by President Bill Clinton. During World War II, Davis was commander of the 99th Fighter Squadron and the 332nd Fighter Group, which escorted bombers on air combat missions over Europe. Davis flew sixty missions in P-39 Airacobra, Curtiss P-40 Warhawk, P-47 Thunderbolt and P-51 Mustang fighters and was one of the first African-American pilots to see combat. Davis followed in his father's footsteps in breaking racial barriers, as Benjamin O. Davis Sr. was the first black brigadier general in the United States Army.

Early life
Benjamin Oliver Davis Jr. was born in Washington, D.C., on December 18, 1912, the  second of three  children born to Benjamin O. Davis Sr. and Elnora Dickerson Davis. His father was a U.S. Army officer, a lieutenant at that time, stationed in Wyoming with an all-white cavalry unit. Davis Sr. served 41 years before he was promoted to brigadier general in October 1940. Elnora Davis died from complications after giving birth to their third child in 1916.

In the summer of 1926, at age 13, Davis Jr (or Davis) flew with a barnstorming pilot at Bolling Field in Washington, D.C. The experience led to his determination to become a pilot himself. In 1929 at the beginning of the Great Depression, Davis graduated from Central High School in Cleveland, Ohio. That same year he attended Western Reserve University (1929–1930).

Early military career
After attending the University of Chicago, Davis entered the United States Military Academy (West Point) in July 1932. He graduated from West Point in 1936, becoming the first black man to do so since 1889. He was sponsored by Representative Oscar De Priest (R-IL) of Chicago, at the time, the only black member of Congress. During his four years at the academy, Davis was isolated by his white classmates on account of his race. He never had a roommate. He ate by himself. His classmates rarely spoke to him outside the line of duty, intending that their "silent treatment" would drive him from the academy. It had the opposite effect; it steeled his determination to endure the animosity and to compete and graduate. Ultimately, his perseverance earned the respect of his classmates, as evidenced by a biographical note of Davis in the 1936 yearbook, the Howitzer:
The courage, tenacity, and intelligence with which he conquered a problem incomparably more difficult than plebe year won for him the sincere admiration of his classmates, and his single-minded determination to continue in his chosen career cannot fail to inspire respect wherever fortune may lead him.

Davis graduated in June 1936, 35th in a class of 276. He was the academy's fourth black graduate after Henry Ossian Flipper (1877), John Hanks Alexander (1887), and Charles Young (1889). When he was commissioned as a second lieutenant, the Army had only two black officers who weren't chaplains – Benjamin O. Davis Sr. and Benjamin O. Davis Jr. After graduation he married Agatha Scott whom he met while a cadet at West Point.

At the start of his junior year at West Point, Davis had applied for the Army Air Corps but was rejected because it did not accept African Americans. In 1936, the U.S. Army assigned Davis to the all-black 24th Infantry Regiment (one of the original Buffalo Soldier regiments) at Fort Benning, Georgia. He was not allowed inside the base officers' club based on his race.

In June 1937, Davis attended the U.S. Army Infantry School at Fort Benning. He was later assigned to teach military tactics at Tuskegee Institute, a historically black college in Tuskegee, Alabama. This was the same assignment his father was given years before; it was a way for the Army to avoid placing a black officer in command of white soldiers.

World War II

Early in 1941, the Roosevelt administration, in response to public pressure for greater black participation in the military as war approached, ordered the War Department to create a black flying unit. Captain Davis was assigned to the first training class at Tuskegee Army Air Field (hence the name Tuskegee Airmen). In July 1941, Davis entered aviation cadet training with the Tuskegee Airmen's first class of aviation cadets, Class 42-C-SE. On March 6, 1942, Davis graduated from aviation cadet training with Captain George S. Roberts; 2nd Lt. Charles DeBow Jr. (Feb 13, 1918 – April 4, 1968), 2nd Lt. Mac Ross (1912–1944), and 2nd Lt. Lemuel R. Custis (1915–2005). Davis and his four classmates became the first African American combat fighter pilots in the U.S. military.

Davis was the first African American officer to solo an Army Air Corps aircraft. In July that year, having been promoted to lieutenant colonel, he was named commander of the first all-black air unit, the 99th Pursuit Squadron.

The squadron, equipped with Curtiss P-40 fighters, was sent to Tunisia in North Africa in the spring of 1943. On June 2, they saw combat for the first time in a dive-bombing mission against the German-held island of Pantelleria as part of Operation Corkscrew. The squadron later supported the Allied invasion of Sicily.

In September 1943, Davis was deployed to the United States to take command of the 332nd Fighter Group, a larger all-black unit preparing to go overseas.  Soon after his arrival, there was an attempt to stop the use of black pilots in combat. Senior officers in the Army Air Forces recommended to the Army chief of staff, General George Marshall, that the 99th (Davis's old unit) be removed from combat operations as it had performed poorly. This infuriated Davis as he had never been told of any deficiencies with the unit. He held a news conference at The Pentagon to defend his men and then presented his case to a War Department committee studying the use of black servicemen.

Marshall ordered an inquiry but allowed the 99th to continue fighting in the meantime. The inquiry eventually reported that the 99th's performance was comparable to other air units, but any questions about the squadron's fitness were answered in January 1944 when its pilots shot down 12 German planes in two days while protecting the Anzio beachhead.

Colonel Davis and his 332nd Fighter Group arrived in Italy soon after that. The four-squadron group, which was called the Red Tails for the distinctive markings of its planes, were based at Ramitelli Airfield and flew many missions deep into German territory. By summer 1944 the Group had transitioned to P-47 Thunderbolts.  In the summer of 1945, Davis took over the all-black 477th Bombardment Group, which was stationed at Godman Field, Kentucky.

During the war, the airmen commanded by Davis had compiled an outstanding record in combat against the Luftwaffe. They flew more than 15,000 sorties, shot down 112 enemy planes, and destroyed or damaged 273 on the ground at a cost of 66 of their own planes and losing only about twenty-five bombers.  Davis himself led 67 missions in P-47s and P-51 Mustangs. He received the Silver Star for a strafing run into Austria and the Distinguished Flying Cross for a bomber-escort mission to Munich on June 9, 1944.

Freeman Field Mutiny 1945
Davis was one of ten officers to preside over the Freeman Field mutiny courts-martial; appointed by General Frank O'Driscoll Hunter. They were: Colonel Benjamin O. Davis Jr., Captain George L. Knox II, Captain James T. Wiley, Captain John H. Duren, Captain Charles R. Stanton, captain William T. Yates, Captain Elmore M. Kennedy, Captain Fitzroy Newsum, 1st Lieutenant William Robert Ming Jr. and 1st Lieutenant James Y. Carter. Trial Judge Advocates were: Captain James W. Redden and 1st Lieutenant Charles B. Hall.

United States Air Force

In July 1948, President Harry S. Truman signed Executive Order 9981 ordering the racial integration of the armed forces. Colonel Davis helped draft the Air Force plan for implementing this order. The Air Force was the first of the services to integrate fully.

In 1949, Davis attended Air War College. He later served at the Pentagon and in overseas posts over the next two decades. Noteworthy is that during his time at the Pentagon, he drafted the staffing package and gained approval to create the Air Force Thunderbird flight demonstration team.  He again saw combat in 1953 when he assumed command of the 51st Fighter-Interceptor Wing (51 FIW) and flew an F-86 Sabre in Korea.  He served as director of operations and training at Far East Air Forces Headquarters, Tokyo, from 1954 until 1955, when he assumed the position of vice commander of Thirteenth Air Force, with additional duty as commander of Air Task Force 13 (Provisional), Taipei, Taiwan. During his time in Tokyo, he was temporarily promoted to the rank of brigadier general.

In April 1957 General Davis arrived at Ramstein Air Base, West Germany, as chief of staff of Twelfth Air Force, U.S. Air Forces in Europe (USAFE). When the Twelfth Air Force was transferred to James Connally Air Force Base, Texas in December 1957, he assumed new duties as deputy chief of staff for operations, Headquarters USAFE, Wiesbaden Air Base, West Germany. While in West Germany he was temporarily promoted to major general in 1959, and his promotion to brigadier general was made permanent in 1960.

In July 1961, he returned to the United States and Headquarters U.S. Air Force, where he served as the director of manpower and organization, deputy chief of staff for programs and requirements. Davis's promotion to major general was made permanent early the next year, and in February 1965 he was assigned as assistant deputy chief of staff, programs and requirements.  He remained in that position until his assignment as chief of staff for the United Nations Command and U.S. Forces in Korea (USFK) in April 1965, at which time he was promoted to lieutenant general. He assumed command of the Thirteenth Air Force at Clark Air Base in the Republic of the Philippines in August 1967.

Davis was assigned as deputy commander in chief, U.S. Strike Command, with headquarters at MacDill Air Force Base, Florida, in August 1968, with additional duty as commander in chief, Middle-East, Southern Asia and Africa. He retired from active military service on February 1, 1970.

On December 9, 1998, Davis Jr. was promoted to general, U.S. Air Force (retired), with President Bill Clinton pinning on his four-star insignia. In the late 1980s he began to work on his autobiography, Benjamin O. Davis Jr.: American: An Autobiography.

Dates of rank

General Davis' effective dates of promotion are:

Decorations and honors
At the time of Davis's retirement, he held the rank of lieutenant general, but on December 9, 1998, President Bill Clinton awarded him a fourth star, raising him to the rank of full general. After retirement, he headed the federal sky marshal program, and in 1971 was named Assistant Secretary of Transportation for Environment, Safety, and Consumer Affairs. Overseeing the development of airport security and highway safety, Davis was one of the chief proponents of the 55 mile per hour speed limit enacted nationwide by the U.S. government in 1974 to save gasoline and lives. He retired from the Department of Transportation in 1975, and in 1978 served on the American Battle Monuments Commission, on which his father had served decades before. In 1991, he published his autobiography, Benjamin O. Davis Jr.: American (Smithsonian Institution Press). He is a 1992 recipient of the Langley Gold Medal from the Smithsonian Institution.

Military decorations
His military decorations included:
  Air Force Distinguished Service Medal with oak leaf cluster
  Army Distinguished Service Medal
  Silver Star
  Legion of Merit with two oak leaf clusters
  Distinguished Flying Cross
  Air Medal with four oak leaf clusters
  Army Commendation Medal with two oak leaf clusters
  Philippine Legion of Honor
 1992 Langley Gold Medal
 Congressional Gold Medal awarded to the Tuskegee Airmen in 2006

Creator of the Davis Line/Median line
Historically, both the People's Republic of China (PRC) and the Republic of China (ROC) on Taiwan espoused a One-China Policy that considered the strait part of the exclusive economic zone of a single "China". In practice, a maritime border of control exists along the median line down the strait. In 1955, Davis defined this median line by drawing a line down the middle of the strait,. The US then pressured both sides into entering into a tacit agreement not to cross the median line.

Honors 
 In 2002, scholar Molefi Kete Asante listed Davis on his list of 100 Greatest African Americans.
 Benjamin O. Davis Jr Aerospace Technical High School Detroit, Michigan, and Benjamin O. Davis Jr. Middle School in Compton, California, as well as the former Gen. Benjamin O. Davis Aviation High School in Cleveland, Ohio, are all named in his honor. Benjamin O. Davis High School of the Aldine Independent School District in Houston, Texas, opened in 2012.
 The Benjamin O. Davis Jr. Award is presented to senior members of the Civil Air Patrol – United States Air Force Auxiliary who successfully complete the second level of professional development, complete the technical training required for the Leadership Award, and attend Squadron Leadership School, designed "to enhance a senior member's performance at the squadron level and to increase understanding of the basic function of a squadron and how to improve squadron operations."
 In 2015, West Point named a newly constructed barracks after him.
In 1994, He was inducted into the National Aviation Hall of Fame in Dayton, Ohio.
 He was inducted into the International Air & Space Hall of Fame at the San Diego Air & Space Museum in 1996.
 On November 1, 2019, the airfield at the United States Air Force Academy, in Colorado Springs, Colorado, was renamed Benjamin O. Davis, Jr. Airfield.

Death

Davis's wife Agatha died on March 10, 2002. (Aged 94) Davis, who had been suffering from Alzheimer's disease, died at age 89 on July 4, 2002, at Walter Reed Army Medical Center in Washington, D.C. He was interred with Agatha on July 17, at Arlington National Cemetery. A Red Tail P-51 Mustang, similar to the one he had flown in World War II, flew overhead during his funeral service. Bill Clinton said, "General Davis is here today as proof that a person can overcome adversity and discrimination, achieve great things, turn skeptics into believers; and through example and perseverance, one person can bring truly amazing change".

See also

 Davis line
 Executive Order 9981
 List of Tuskegee Airmen
 List of Tuskegee Airmen Cadet Pilot Graduation Classes
 Military history of African Americans

References

Further reading
 Applegate, Katherine. The Story of Two American Generals Benjamin O. Davis Jr. and Colin L. Powell, Gareth Stevens Pub., 1995 
 Sandler, Stanley. Segregated Skies: All-Black Combat Squadrons of WW II, Smithsonian Institution Press, 1992.

External links

 Benjamin O. Davis, Jr. Collection Archives Division , National Air and Space Museum
 American History: Benjamin Davis
 A Tribute to Benjamin O. Davis Jr.
 African Americans in the U.S. Army – army.mil

1912 births
2002 deaths
Aviators from Washington, D.C.
Burials at Arlington National Cemetery
Case Western Reserve University alumni
Recipients of the Croix de Guerre (France)
Recipients of the Distinguished Service Medal (US Army)
Recipients of the Legion of Merit
Recipients of the Distinguished Flying Cross (United States)
Recipients of the Silver Star
Recipients of the Air Medal
United States Military Academy alumni
Recipients of the Philippine Legion of Honor
Tuskegee Airmen
United States Air Force generals
United States Army Air Forces pilots of World War II
United States Army Air Forces officers
Recipients of the Order of the Sword (United States)
Military personnel from Washington, D.C.
African-American aviators
Recipients of the Air Force Distinguished Service Medal
21st-century African-American people
United States Air Force personnel of the Korean War